WRUL (97.3 FM) is a radio station broadcasting a country music format. Licensed to Carmi, Illinois, United States, the station serves the Evansville, Indiana area. The station is currently owned by Mark and Saundra Lange, through licensee The Original Company, Inc., and features programming from Compass Media Networks.

See also
Fred G. Hoffherr

References

External links
WRUL.com

RUL
Country radio stations in the United States